The Religious Freedom Act was an 1811 law passed by the Great and General Court of Massachusetts. It repudiated a decision made by Chief Justice Theophilus Parsons in the case of Barnes v. The First Parish in Falmouth. The law ensured that citizens could use their tax dollars to support the church of their choice, not just the one officially sponsored by their community.

References

Works cited

Religious law
Freedom of religion